The Philippine one-peso note (₱1) was a denomination of Philippine currency. On its final release, José Rizal was featured on the front side of the bill, while the Declaration of the Philippine Independence was featured on the reverse side.

This banknote was circulated until the Central Bank stopped printing this currency in 1973. It was replaced by coins upon the introduction of the Ang Bagong Lipunan series.

History

Pre-independence
 1918: PNB issued notes. Features a portrait of Charles A. Conant.
 1918-1929: Philippine Treasury Certificates. Features a portrait of Apolinario Mabini.

 1944: Philippine commonwealth issues treasury certificates 1 peso bill word "VICTORY" at BACK
 1943: Japanese government 1 peso bill.
 1949: Philippine issued treasury certificates Victory Series Central Bank of the Philippines whoever now all today. "VICTORY, CENTRAL BANK OF THE PHILIPPINES"  at back

Version history

Independence
1951: English series, Features the portrait of Apolinario Mabini, a political philosopher and revolutionary who wrote a constitutional plan for the first Philippine republic of 1899–1901, and served as its first prime minister in 1899. The reverse features the Barasoain Church, where the drafting of the Malolos Constitution and the inauguration of the First Philippine republic took place. The design elements of this bill will be later adopted for the ten peso bill upon the launch of the Pilipino series notes in 1969.
1969: Pilipino series, José Rizal replaced the portrait of Mabini. The note is now predominantly blue in color. On the reverse, it now features the Declaration of the Philippine Independence.
1973: The one peso bill was not included when the Ang Bagong Lipunan series was introduced. The banknote was later demonetized together with the English Series and the other Pilipino Series banknotes on February 28, 1974, pursuant to Presidential Decree No. 378.

Version history

Printing years

References

Philippines currency history
One-base-unit banknotes